Charles Frederick Stubbs (22 January 1920 – 12 May 1984) was an English footballer who scored 17 goals from 42 appearances in the Football League playing as a centre forward for Darlington in the 1940s. He joined the club while stationed in the area during the Second World War, and went on to be player-manager of Uxbridge.

References

1920 births
1984 deaths
Footballers from West Ham
English footballers
Association football forwards
Darlington F.C. players
Uxbridge F.C. players
English Football League players
English football managers
British military personnel of World War II